Monaco competed at the 1928 Summer Olympics held at Amsterdam in the Netherlands.

Athletics

Men
Track & Field

Men
Field Events

Rowing

Ranks given are within the heat.

Sailing

Art Competition
Monaco had three men represent them in these competitions, Michel Ravarino, Marc-Cesar Scotto and Auguste Philippe Marocco.

References
Official Olympic Reports
J.O. d'Amsterdam (in French)

Nations at the 1928 Summer Olympics
1928 Summer Olympics
Summer Olympics